This is a List of fictional ducks in animation and is a subsidiary to the List of fictional ducks and List of fictional animals. It is limited solely to notable duck characters who appear in various animated television shows and feature-length films. Characters that appear in multiple works shall be listed with their earliest appearance solely.

A

B

C

D

E

F

G

H

L

M

N

O

P

Q

R

S

T

W

Y

Unsorted
Dáithí Lacha ("David Duck"), an Irish-speaking cartoon duck with an eponymous show on Irish television station RTÉ.
Canard Thunderbeak, Check "Grin" Hardwing, Duke L'Orange, Mallory McMallard, Nosedive Flashblade, Tanya Vanderflock, Wildwing Flashblade - The Mighty Ducks: superhero ducks from Disney's The Mighty Ducks
Everett Ducklair - A main character duck from PKNA
Flick Duck, from the TV show PB&J Otter
Stephan Vladuck/Camera 9 and Urk - minor duck characters from PKNA

References

Animation
Ducks animation
Ducks